The 2022–23 Ghana Premier League, known as the betPawa Premier League for sponsorship reasons, is the 67th season of the top professional association football league in Ghana. The season started in September 2022 and is scheduled to end on June 2023.

Asante Kotoko are the defending champions.

Teams 
Eighteen teams will compete in the league; the 15 from the previous season and the 3 winners of the Division One zones. The promoted teams are Samartex and Kotoku Royals who both achieved promotion for the first time. They replaced WAFA, Techiman Eleven Wonders and Elmina Sharks.

Stadiums and locations

Club managers and captains 
The table lists club managers.

Managerial changes

League table

Results

Season statistics

Top scorers

Assists

Clean sheets

Awards

Monthly awards 
As of March 2023

References

External links 

 Official Website

Ghana Premier League
2022 in Ghanaian sport
2022–23 in Ghanaian football
Football in Ghana
Ghana